George Watson's College Rowing Club (GWCRC) is the rowing club for George Watson's College, in the city of Edinburgh, Scotland.

GWCRC is affiliated to Scottish Rowing. 

The club has produced multiple British champions.

Honours

British champions

See also 
Scottish Rowing
British Rowing

References

External links 
 Scottish Rowing | The National Governing Body for rowing in Scotland
 British Rowing | The National Governing Body for rowing in the United Kingdom
 George Watson's College

Sports teams in Edinburgh
Rowing clubs in Scotland
Scholastic rowing in the United Kingdom